Li Haonan (born 1 August 1981) is a Chinese short track speed skater. He competed in two events at the 2006 Winter Olympics and achieved 5th Place in the 5,000 metres Relay.

References

External links
 

1981 births
Living people
Chinese male short track speed skaters
Olympic short track speed skaters of China
Short track speed skaters at the 2006 Winter Olympics
Speed skaters from Changchun
Asian Games medalists in short track speed skating
Short track speed skaters at the 2003 Asian Winter Games
Medalists at the 2003 Asian Winter Games
Asian Games silver medalists for China
21st-century Chinese people